"Come Over" is the fifth UK single and the second US single from Estelle's second studio album Shine (2008). A remixed version of the song was released, featuring reggae artist Sean Paul. It was released to US radio on 15 September 2008.

In the UK the digital download was released on 13 December 2008. The physical release was scheduled for the same date but was cancelled last minute.

Music video
The music video was filmed during the week of 2 October 2008. It was directed by Lil X and was produced by the company DNA. The video features a cameo from Kardinal Offishall, and was uploaded to YouTube.

Estelle was asked about being close to Sean Paul in the video, and said: "There are two arguments going on in your head. 'I can't be fake, but how can I do this without feeling like a slut?' It's a tough one."

Charts

References

External links
 Estelle MySpace Page
 Estelle featuring Sean Paul

2008 singles
Estelle (musician) songs
Sean Paul songs
Music videos directed by Director X
Songs written by Estelle (musician)
Songs written by Sean Paul
Songs written by John Legend
2008 songs
Songs written by Supa Dups